Janko Rodin (17 February 1900 – 14 September 1974) was a Croatian footballer and later president of HNK Hajduk Split.

Career
Born in Kaštel Lukšić, Austro-Hungary (nowadays Croatia), he played either as full-back or winger. He started his career in Hajduk Split immediately after the end of the First World War and will spend most of his playing career at Hajduk. The exception was a period of time that he worked as a customs officer in Belgrade and during that time he played with BSK Belgrade.  He also played one season in Czechoslovakia with Slavia Prague.  He finished his career in 1931.

After retiring, he became the president of Hajduk Split in 1939.  He headed the Hajduk delegation that, on 23 April 1944, got on board of Yugoslav Partisans armed boat "Topčider" and escaped Axis-occupied Split towards the free island of Vis. He was Hajduk president until 1945. He died in Kaštel Lukšić on 14 September 1974.

International career
He made his debut for Yugoslavia in a February 1924 friendly match against Austria and earned a total of 4 caps, scoring no goals (3 as member of Hajduk during 1924 and one as member of BSK in 1926). Rodin was part of the Yugoslav football team at the 1924 Summer Olympics. His final international was an October 1926 King Alexander's Cup match against Romania.

Honours
Hajduk Split
Yugoslav championship: 1929

References

External links
 

1900 births
1974 deaths
People from Kaštela
People from the Kingdom of Dalmatia
Association football defenders
Association football midfielders
Yugoslav footballers
Yugoslavia international footballers
Footballers at the 1924 Summer Olympics
Olympic footballers of Yugoslavia
HNK Hajduk Split players
SK Slavia Prague players
OFK Beograd players
Yugoslav First League players
Yugoslav expatriate footballers
Expatriate footballers in Czechoslovakia
Yugoslav expatriate sportspeople in  Czechoslovakia
HNK Hajduk Split non-playing staff
Burials at Lovrinac Cemetery